Macrotorus is a monotypic genus of flowering plants belonging to the family Monimiaceae. The only species is Macrotorus utriculatus.

Its native range is Southeastern Brazil.

References

Monimiaceae
Monimiaceae genera
Monotypic Laurales genera